The West Virginia Night Express (also sometimes called the Wheeling Night Express) was an American named train of the Baltimore and Ohio Railroad (B&O) on its route between Chicago, Illinois and Wheeling, West Virginia, with major station stops in Willard and Newark, Ohio. The B&O inaugurated the West Virginia Night Express in 1912. It was discontinued in 1956 due to declining passenger demand.

History
The Baltimore and Ohio Railroad was chartered in 1827 and grew to be one of the largest passenger railways in the United States, often by acquiring other, smaller railroads. B&O trains began operating between Chicago and Wheeling in 1880.

From 1912 until 1956 the B&O provided overnight sleeping car service between Chicago's Grand Central Station and Wheeling, West Virginia on the Wheeling Night Express, Train No. 46. The reverse route, Train No. 45, was served by the Chicago Night Express.  In 1928, the routes were consolidated with Train Nos. 15/16 from Willard, Ohio to Chicago.  During World War II, the West Virginia Night Express was consolidated with Train No. 9, the Pittsburgh-Chicago Express on the western end of the run from the junction at Willard, Ohio to Chicago.  In 1946, the West Virginia Night Express resumed independent operation from Willard to Chicago.

Decline and end of the train
As railroad passenger traffic was declining nationwide, the B&O discontinued the West Virginia Night Express on December 1, 1956, which ended passenger rail service between Chicago and Wheeling.

Stations

Schedule and equipment

In 1947, the eastbound West Virginia Night Express, Train # 46 operated on the following schedule (departure times at principal stops shown):

In the 1940s, the eastbound West Virginia Night Express consisted of two or three head-ended cars, an RPO baggage car, a coach and a sleeper.  Between Newark, Ohio and Wheeling there was a diner car.  In 1947, the diner car was replaced with a diner-parlor car.  The train was dieselized in 1956, the last year it operated.

References

Passenger trains of the Baltimore and Ohio Railroad
Named passenger trains of the United States
Night trains of the United States
Passenger rail transportation in Illinois
Passenger rail transportation in Indiana
Passenger rail transportation in Ohio
Passenger rail transportation in West Virginia
Railway services introduced in 1912
Railway services discontinued in 1956